The Stage Coach is a 1704 play by George Farquhar and Peter Motteux. A farce, it is based on the 1680 French play Les Carrosses d'Orléans by Jean de La Chapelle.

It was staged at the Lincoln's Inn Fields Theatre in London as an afterpiece to a revival of John Crowne's The Country Wit. The cast included Thomas Doggett as Nicodemus Somebody, Barton Booth as Captain Basil, George Pack as Fetch, John Freeman as Micher and Abigail Hunt as Dolly.

References

Bibliography
 Richetti, John. The Cambridge History of English Literature, 1660-1780. Cambridge University Press, 2005.

1704 plays
Plays by George Farquhar
West End plays
Restoration comedy